The Corsairs of Cythera is a 1981 fantasy role-playing game adventure published by Ragnarok Enterprises.

Contents
The Corsairs of Cythera is an adventure in which the Achajaian fleet will attack Carzal, imperial capital of Ilchania, in twelve days, and only timely intervention by the Corsairs of Cythera might save the empire.

Reception
Ronald Pehr reviewed The Corsairs of Cythera in The Space Gamer No. 49. Pehr commented that "The Corsairs of Cythera costs less than half as much as most fantasy game supplements, and lacks the detail and complexity of the better ones. But it does provide and exciting, entertaining adventure. If the referee doesn't mind putting up with its flaws, the players will be satisfied."

Reviews
Pegasus #8 (July/Aug., 1982)

References

Fantasy role-playing game adventures
Role-playing game supplements introduced in 1981